The GT Cup Open Europe is a grand tourer-style sports car racing series founded in 2019 by the Spanish GT Sport Organización. It is a support category to the International GT Open featuring FIA GT4-spec cars as well as eligible one-make category cars.

Format 
The series consists of events in various European countries which feature two races over a weekend. Each weekend the series hosts two 55 minute races with two separate qualifying sessions determining the grid order. There is a mandatory pit stop with a minimum time that must be abided by. During this pit stop, only the driver change may occur if the car is a two driver entry. Fuel may not be added and unless there is a puncture, no tires can be changed.

Usually this series supports the International GT Open as separate races on the same race weekends, but starting in 2020 due to low car counts, GT Sport decided to combine the two series' races if there were less than 9 GT Cup Open Europe entries.

Regulations 
Each race consists of a field of grand touring-style cars. Eligible models include all homologated FIA GT4 cars such as the Mercedes AMG GT4 and the Audi R8 LMS GT4 as well as one-make category cars such as the Lamborghini Huracán Super Trofeo and the Porsche 991 Carrera Cup. The series has three sub-categories for the Drivers' Championships: Silver, for driver pairings consisting of two Silver ranked drivers; Pro-Am, for driver pairings consisting of one Gold or Silver driver and one Am driver; and Am, for two Am rated drivers or a solo Am rated driver. No other driver combinations are allowed. After the third race of the season, all Silver ranked entries were moved to the Pro-Am category apparently in an attempt to remove the category due to very few entries. The Silver category did not continue in 2020.

Champions

Drivers

Current Categories

Overall

Pro-Am

Am

Defunct Categories

Silver

Teams

References

External links 
 GT Cup Open Europe Official website

 
Sports car racing series
European auto racing series
Recurring sporting events established in 2019
GT4 (sports car class)